Dalimbachak is a village under Chakdwipa, Anchal in Haldia Panchayet Samiti, India.

Villages in Purba Medinipur district